Franklin M. Drew (July 19, 1837 – February 27, 1925) was an American politician and lawyer in the state of Maine. He served as Secretary of State of Maine from 1868 to 1871. A veteran of the American Civil War, Drew later served as a United States pension agent and a judge of probate in Androscoggin County, Maine.

References

1837 births
1925 deaths
People from Turner, Maine
Politicians from Lewiston, Maine
Maine Republicans
Bowdoin College alumni
Maine lawyers
People of Maine in the American Civil War
19th-century American lawyers